Brunca Sign Language is a village sign language of an indigenous Brunca community in southern Costa Rica. It is unrelated to Costa Rican Sign Language.

References

Village sign languages
Sign languages of Costa Rica